Květa Hrdličková and Barbara Rittner were the defending champions, but Hrdličková did not compete this year. Rittner teamed up with María Vento-Kabchi and lost in the final to Elena Bovina and Zsófia Gubacsi 6–3, 6–1.

Seeds

Draw

Draw

References
 Main Draw

2002 Women's Doubles
2002 WTA Tour
Estoril Open